Lester was a small town near Stampede Pass, just south of Snoqualmie Pass in King County, founded in 1892 by the Northern Pacific Railway (now the BNSF Railway). Lester is located along what is currently National Forest Development Road 54, on land owned by Tacoma Water, a division of Tacoma Public Utilities.

Although most remaining freestanding buildings were demolished in 2017, numerous foundations from the settlement remain.

History

Lester was founded in 1891 as the logging camp of "Deans", named after the owner of Dean's Lumber Company. In 1886, the Northern Pacific Railway constructed a large depot, roundhouse, coal dock and other steam locomotive support facilities for the Stampede Pass railway; Lester was at the foot of the railroad's maximum grade. The town was also renamed "Lester" in honor of Northern Pacific telegraph operator Lester Hansaker.

While a series of forest fires in 1902 devastated the local logging industry, Lester continued to thrive as a company town for Northern Pacific. In the 1920s, the town's population peaked at approximately 1,000, and most of the modern structures in Lester were built during the decade. During the 1940s and 1950s, the town transitioned away from railroading and towards logging, with new camps established at Lester by Soundview Pulp Company, later acquired by Scott Paper Company.

The city of Tacoma began purchasing property in Lester in 1963, seeking to protect the Green River watershed where the city sources its drinking water. Tacoma attempted to block access to the town, leading to protests and the destruction of gates on the only all-weather road leading to Lester, in an incident known as the "Battle of the Lester Gate". King County sued the city of Tacoma over blocking access to Lester, arguing that the road was owned by the county. The King County Superior Court ruled in Tacoma's favor in July 1962 to temporarily keep locks on its Lester gates. The court later determined in 1965 that the county's failure to include other landowners in the suit hampered the court's abilities to adjudicate the case.

The Scott camp at Lester was one of the last in King County, and closed in April 1978, and the population of the town dropped to 22 by the following March. The mothballing of the Stampede Pass rail line by Burlington Northern in 1984 led to further abandonment of Lester, with the city of Tacoma and United States Forest Service restricting access to residents and their guests. Lester residents and railroad buffs attempted to designate the town's railroad depot as a historic landmark in 1983, when it was threatened with possible demolition, and was nearly moved to North Bend to preserve it. The depot was eventually destroyed in an arson fire.

In 1985, the Washington State Legislature passed a law that dissolved school districts with fewer than five students, leading to the disbandment of the Lester school district. A mock funeral was held for the town by residents in response to the closure of the school.

The town's "last resident", Gertrude Murphy, died in September 2002 at the age of 99.

Telephone numbers in the town were 657-2xxx.  The switch that served the town, a North Electric CX-100, is preserved at the Museum of Communications in Seattle. A small switching building, with (now defunct) U S West painted on its door still exists in Lester. 

For public safety and watershed security, the remaining large group of buildings in Lester (consisting of the guard house, gas and oil shack, and warehouse) were demolished by Tacoma Water in 2017. Other smaller relics of the settlement still exist.

Geography
Lester is located, east of Enumclaw, Washington along the Green River and BNSF Railway line. Its elevation is 1,634 feet (498 m) above sea level.

Gallery

References

External links

 N.P. Ry. A Short History of Lester and Stampede Pass Article on the history of Lester and the area around Stampede Pass, and the relationship with the Northern Pacific Railway and BNSF Railway.
 N.P. Ry. Spelled in Reverse: E.G. Morgan and a Town called Nagrom Article on the history of Nagrom, Washington and other areas around Stampede Pass including Lester.
 N.P. Ry. Stampede Pass: A Virtual Tour, Auburn to Ellensburg Milepost listing of the Northern Pacific Railway/BNSF Railway line which goes through Lester and Stampede Pass.
 Lester, Washington is at coordinates .
 White River Valley Museum Journal: Lester - In the Shadow of Stampede Pass An excellent article on the history of Lester and Stampede Pass.

Ghost towns in King County, Washington
Railway towns in Washington (state)